Shavir Tarapore (born 26 December 1957) is an Indian One Day International and Twenty20 cricket umpire, who has umpired 4 Tests, 25 ODIs and 3 T20Is, as of 2014.

Shavir Tarapore first stood in an International ODI in 1999.

He also played a few games for Karnataka in a career spanning from 1980/81 to 1986/87. He played 6 matches, scoring 20 runs with a high score of 15. He also picked up 9 wickets with his legbreaks at an average of 37.66. He took 3 catches in those 6 games.

Shavir Tarapore was inducted into the ICC's International Panel of Umpires, as a replacement for Suresh Shastri.

His father Keki Tarapore was Indian cricketer Rahul Dravid's childhood coach.

See also
 List of Test cricket umpires
 List of One Day International cricket umpires
 List of Twenty20 International cricket umpires

References
Cricinfo: Shavir Tarapore

1957 births
Living people
Indian Test cricket umpires
Indian One Day International cricket umpires
Indian Twenty20 International cricket umpires
Indian cricketers
Karnataka cricketers